The National Loaf was a bread made from wholemeal flour with added calcium and vitamins, introduced in Britain during the Second World War by the Federation of Bakers (FOB). Introduced in 1942, the loaf (similar to today's brown bread) was made from wholemeal flour to combat wartime shortages of white flour and sugar. The loaf was abolished in October 1956.

Consistency
Working with the government, the FOB published four recipes for wholemeal bread, which became the only recipes that could legally be used to make bread in the U.K. The National Loaf was grey, mushy and unappetising; only one person in seven preferred it to white bread, which became unavailable. The government insisted on it because it saved space in shipping food to Britain
and allowed better utilization of existing stocks of wheat. Standardised recipes also allowed the government to more effectively manage the consumption of its ingredients. Finally, the government wanted to discourage the immoderate consumption of bread without having to ration it directly. To further this objective, orders were passed which stipulated that bread could not be sliced or wrapped by bakeries, nor sold until the day after it was baked.

The primary reason for the loaf's mushy texture was not the use of wholemeal flour, but rather the reduced sugar content in the mandated recipes. Sugar was in extremely short supply throughout the war and the government was keen to limit its consumption wherever possible. Without the usual amount of sugar for the yeast to consume, the dough would not rise as effectively. Nevertheless, the mandating of the loaf caused wholemeal bread to endure an undeserved reputation for decades in the UK as being associated with a mushy and unappetising product.

History
The Federation of Bakers was set up in 1942 to produce the National Loaf.

Eleanor Roosevelt, the American First Lady, visiting Buckingham Palace in 1942, noted that "We were served on gold and silver plates, but our bread was the same kind of war bread every other family had to eat."

Although bread remained off ration during the war, this was not the case after the war ended. The Labour government under Clement Attlee which replaced Winston Churchill's wartime coalition after hostilities in Europe had ended rationed bread starting in 1946. Reasons for this included a poor harvest caused by heavy rains, the curtailment of American assistance following the closure of the Combined Food Board, the need to divert large quantities of foodstuffs to destinations outside the UK (in particular, the devastated regions of Western Europe which at the time were widely feared to be vulnerable to the spread of communism), and Labour's general enthusiasm for a centralized planned economy in which rationing was a key component. In contrast, to the Conservatives under Churchill became increasingly opposed to rationing in general and were particularly bitter in their hostility to the rationing and continued regulation of bread.

Eventually, the Attlee ministry relented in the face of massive public criticism and the rationing of bread in the UK ended in 1948.

See also

Rationing in the United Kingdom
Woolton pie

References

Further reading
 

British breads
United Kingdom home front during World War II